The Chowanoke, also spelled Chowanoc, were an Algonquian-language Native American tribe who historically inhabited the coastal area of the Upper South of the United States. At the time of the first English contacts in 1585 and 1586, they were the largest and most powerful Algonquian tribe in present-day North Carolina, occupying most or all of the coastal banks of the Chowan River in the northeastern part of the state. Their peoples had occupied their main town since 825 AD. Earlier Indigenous cultures occupied the area from 4500 BC.

After warfare, in 1677 English colonists set aside a reservation for the tribe near Bennett's Creek. The Chowanoke suffered high mortality due to infectious disease, including a smallpox epidemic in 1696. Descendants with Chowanoke ancestry survived but merged with other groups, and they lost the last of their communal land in 1821. Chowanoke descendants lived in Gates and Chowan counties.

History

Precontact 
The Algonquian peoples who developed in what is now known as North Carolina likely migrated from northern coastal areas, and developed a culture modified by local conditions. The numerous tribes occupied an approximately  area of Carolina Algonqkian territory in northeastern North Carolina, from the Neuse River to the Chesapeake Bay.  Tribes included the Chowanoke, Weapemeoc, Poteskeet, Moratoc, Roanoke, Secotan (Secoughtan), Pomuik, Neusiok, Croatan and possibly the Chesepiooc.

Archeological excavation in the 1980s at the site of Chowanoke confirmed Lane's report of its location and elements of his description. The town had been occupied by humans for nearly 1000 years, with radiocarbon dating establishing 825 AD as the earliest date of culture related to the Chowanoke people. The town was a mile long, including large agricultural fields for cultivated crops. It was home to several hundred Chowanoke people and possibly as many as 2,100. Near the north end of what the archeologists called Area B, they found a precinct for the ruler and nobility of elite residences, public buildings, temples, and burials.  This may have been the 30-longhouse cluster observed by Harriot. Evidence of other residences was found in areas that have been eroded at the edges of the peninsula, as the site has been reduced by the river.

Other parts of the site showed older habitation: occupation in the Middle Archaic Morrow Mountain phase (ca. 3500-4500 BC); and again in the Deep Creek (8000-300 BC) and Mount Pleasant (300 BC-AD 800) phases of the Woodland period. This is typical of other sites of indigenous habitation, in which different groups lived in certain areas and abandoned them for a time, and other groups later migrated to occupy the area again.

16th century 
Infectious diseases transmitted by contact with European explorers and colonists, such as measles and smallpox, likely caused high fatalities and considerably weakened the Chowanoke, as took place with other coastal Carolina Algonquian peoples. None had natural immunity to such new diseases, which had been endemic among Europeans for centuries. The neighboring Iroquoian-speaking Tuscarora, who had inhabited areas to the inland, moved in and expelled the remaining Chowanoke from the territory along the river.

17th century 
According to the 16th-century English explorer Ralph Lane, the Chowanoke (Chowanoc, Chawonoc) had 19 villages, with the capital being the town of Chowanoke. Present-day Harrellsville in Hertford County developed near this historic site.  The Chowanoke were the most numerous and most powerful of the Algonquian tribes in North Carolina.  Lane described this town as being large enough to muster 700-800 warriors, which meant the capital's population was likely more than 2100.  A later account by Thomas Harriot estimated that all the villages could muster 800 warriors. Lane's account was quite accurate in terms of his description of the town, its location and its structures, which was confirmed by later archeological excavations there. The population estimates may have accurately been between his (which might have been 4,000 for all the people, and Harriot's, about 2,100 overall).

In 1607 an English colonial expedition, in the area on orders from Captain John Smith of Jamestown, found that hardly any Chowanoke people were left along the Chowan River.  They had been reduced to one settlement across the river in Gates County on Bennett's Creek.

Several decades later, in 1644 and 1675–77, the Chowanoke had regained sufficient strength to wage two wars against English settlers.  They met defeat each time.  After these wars, in 1677 the settlers designated the Chowanoke settlement on Bennett's Creek as the first Indian reservation in the territory of the present-day United States of America. It consisted of 11,360 acres.

18th century 
The Chowanoke through the 18th century gradually lost land through sales and other actions. Men's names were recorded on tribal land conveyance documents.

19th century 
In 1821 they lost the last 30 acres of communal land.

Native American descendants, such as the Chowanoke, were often classified among the free people of color on census documents. They no longer functioned formally as a tribe and disappeared from most historical accounts.

Heritage group 
In the early 21st century, people who claimed Chowanoke ancestry in the Bennett's Creek area formed an organization called the Chowanoke Indian Nation. Although they use nation in their name, the group is neither federally recognized nor state-recognized as a Native American tribe.

Delois Chavis has been a leader in this effort; she grew up in Winton and said her parents and grandparents gave her a strong sense of Native American identity. As part of efforts to renew their people, she and other Chowanoke bought 146 acres of their former reservation land in Gates County, in an area known as Indian Neck. They plan to build a cultural center there to aid in the revitalization of their culture.

References

External links
 Chowanoac, North Carolina History Project
 Marvin T. Jones, "A Chowanoke Family", Roanoke-Chowan
 Chowanoke Descendants Community
 Chowanoke Indian Nation

Extinct Native American tribes
Indigenous peoples of the Southeastern Woodlands
Algonquian peoples
Native American history of North Carolina
Algonquian ethnonyms
Pre-emancipation African-American history